
Gmina Wielowieś is a rural gmina (administrative district) in Gliwice County, Silesian Voivodeship, in southern Poland.

Villages
Gmina Wielowieś contains the villages and settlements of Błażejowice, Borowiany, Chwoszcz, Czarków, Dąbrówka, Diana, Gajowice, Gogol, Goj, Jerzmanów, Kieleczka, Kolonia, Kotków, Napłatki, Pustkowie, Radonia, Sieroty, Świbie, Ubowice, Wielowieś, Wiśnicze and Zacharzowice.

Neighbouring gminas
Gmina Wielowieś is bordered by the town of Pyskowice and by the gminas of Jemielnica, Krupski Młyn, Strzelce Opolskie, Toszek, Tworóg, Zawadzkie and Zbrosławice.

References

Wielowies
Gliwice County